Roosevelt is a town in Kiowa County, Oklahoma, United States. The population was 248 at the 2010 census, a decline of 11.4 percent from 283 in 2000. The town was named for President Theodore Roosevelt.

History
According to the Encyclopedia of Oklahoma History and Culture, the present town of Roosevelt was originally planned by Parkersburg Development Company before the opening of the Kiowa, Comanche, and Apache Reservation in 1901. At that time, the town was known as Parkersburg. However, another town by the same name already existed. Thus, the name was changed to Roosevelt by a townsite organizer, Charlie Parker, who had served under Theodore Roosevelt in the Spanish–American War. A post office named Roosevelt was established October 31, 1901. President Theodore Roosevelt actually visited the town in 1903.

By 1907, the town population had grown to 173. The population was 298 in 1910, 744 in 1940, and 679 in 1950. The population then declined to 280 in 2000.

Geography
Roosevelt is located at  (34.850457, -99.022302).

Roosevelt is at the intersection of US Route 183 and Oklahoma State Highway 19.  Great Plains State Park and Tom Steed Reservoir are to the southeast.

Demographics

As of the census of 2000, there were 280 people, 133 households, and 80 families residing in the town. There were 179 housing units at an average density of 375.3 per square mile (144.0/km2). The racial makeup of the town was 86.79% White, 2.50% African American, 1.07% Native American, 0.36% Pacific Islander, 3.57% from other races, and 5.71% from two or more races. Hispanic or Latino of any race were 11.43% of the population.

There were 133 households, out of which 21.8% had children under the age of 18 living with them, 48.1% were married couples living together, 6.8% had a female householder with no husband present, and 39.8% were non-families. 36.8% of all households were made up of individuals, and 24.8% had someone living alone who was 65 years of age or older. The average household size was 2.11 and the average family size was 2.73.

In the town, the population was spread out, with 19.6% under the age of 18, 6.8% from 18 to 24, 27.5% from 25 to 44, 20.4% from 45 to 64, and 25.7% who were 65 years of age or older. The median age was 43 years. For every 100 females, there were 105.9 males. For every 100 females age 18 and over, there were 92.3 males.

The median income for a household in the town was $22,500, and the median income for a family was $35,893. Males had a median income of $24,583 versus $20,000 for females. The per capita income for the town was $13,619. About 15.6% of families and 21.5% of the population were below the poverty line, including 10.5% of those under the age of eighteen and 25.9% of those 65 or over.

Notable person
General Tommy Franks has lived on 240 acres southeast of Roosevelt since his retirement from the US Army in 2003.

References

Towns in Kiowa County, Oklahoma
Towns in Oklahoma